Targa is a rural locality in the local government area of Launceston, in the Northern region of Tasmania. The 2016 census determined a population of 38 for the state suburb of Targa.

History
Targa is an Aboriginal word for “cry”. The locality was gazetted in 1963.

Geography
The St Patricks River forms most of the western boundary, and all of the northern and north-eastern boundaries.

Road infrastructure
The Tasman Highway (A3) enters from the south-west and runs through to the north-West. The C405 route (Camden Hill Road) starts at an intersection with the A3 and runs through to the east. The C828 route (Targa Hill Road) starts at an intersection with the A3 and exits to the west.

References

Launceston, Tasmania
Localities of City of Launceston
Towns in Tasmania